European route E55 is an E-route. It passes through the following cities:
Helsingborg … Helsingør – Copenhagen – Køge – Vordingborg – Nykøbing Falster – Gedser … Rostock – Berlin – Lübbenau – Dresden – Teplice – Prague – Tábor – Linz – Salzburg – Villach – Tarvisio – Udine – Palmanova – Venice – Ravenna – Cesena – Rimini – Fano – Ancona – Pescara – Canosa di Puglia – Bari – Brindisi … Igoumenitsa – Preveza – Rhion – Patrai – Pyrgos – Kalamáta.

From Helsingborg, the route was supposed to continue northward through Sweden and into Finland, but a decision was made to keep the E4 designation in Sweden, formerly used for a European route from Lisbon to Helsinki. E55 is not and has not been signposted in Sweden. Since 2018 E55 is not signposted between Helsingør and Køge in Denmark, but is signposted south of Køge.

Route

Sweden 
Helsingborg

Ferry 
  Helsingborg –  Helsingør, the HH Ferry route

Denmark

Exits and service areas in Denmark 

 3 Espergærde
 4 Kvistgård
 5 Humlebæk
 6 Nivå
 7 Kokkedal
 9 Hørsholm C
| Isterød
 10 Hørsholm S
 12 Vedbæk
 13 Gl. Holte
 14 Nærum
| Lærkereden/Storkereden
 15 Lundtofte
 16 Lyngby C
 Kgs. Lyngby  Copenhagen
 17 Jægersborgvej
 18 Nyborgvej
 19 Buddinge
 Gladsaxe  Hillerød  Copenhagen
 20 Gladsaxe
 21 Frederikssundvej
 23 Jyllingevej
 Rødovre  Frederikssund,  Ballerup
 24 Roskildevej
 Brøndby  Roskilde  Copenhagen
 Avedøre  Malmö
 25 Vallensbæk S
 26 Ishøj Strand
 Ishøj  Ballerup,  Ishøj, Copenhagen V 
 27 Greve N
 28 Greve C
 29 Greve S
 |  Karlslunde
 30 Solrød N
 31 Solrød S  Roskilde
 32 Køge
 Køge Vest  Odense
 33 Lellinge
 34 Herfølge
 35 Haslev
| Piberhus
 36 Bregentved
 Rønnede  Næstved (planned 2031)
 37 Rønnede  
 38 Tappernøje |
 39 Bårse
 40 Udby
 41 Vordingborg
Northern Farø bridge
 42 Farø 
Southern Farø bridge
 43 Nørre Alslev
 44 Eskildstrup  Nykøbing F, Gedser

 Nykøbing F Ø

Ferry 
  Gedser –  Rostock

Germany 
: Rostock – Wittstock/Dosse
: Wittstock/Dosse – Oberkrämer, Kremmen
: Oberkrämer, Kremmen - Schönefeld
: Schönefeld – Dresden
: Dresden
: Dresden – near Geising

Czech Republic 
: Petrovice – Ústí nad Labem – Trmice (Start of Concurrency with E 442) – Řehlovice (end of concurrency with E 442 – Prague
: Prague()))))
: Prague - Mirošovice
: Mirošovice - Mezno
: Mezno – Tábor – České Budějovice) 
: České Budějovice – Dolní Dvořiště

Austria 
: Leopoldschlag – Freistadt 
: Freistadt – Unterweitersdorf 
: Unterweitersdorf – Linz – Ansfelden
: Ansfelden (Start of Concurrency with) – Sattledt(End of Concurrency with ) – Salzburg (End of Concurrency with ),,
: Salzburg – Spittal an der Drau (Start of Concurrency with) – Villach, ((End of Concurrency with ),
: Villach – Arnoldstein

Italy 
: Tarvisio – Udine – Palmanova
: Palmanova (Start of Concurrency with ) - Quarto d'Altino (End of Concurrency with )
: Quarto d'Altino – Venice
: Venice – Ravenna
: Ravenna – Cesena()
: Cesena – Rimini – Fano – Ancona – Pescara – Canosa di Puglia – Bari
: Bari
: Bari – Fasano
: Fasano – Brindisi(

Ferry 
  Brindisi –  Igoumenitsa

Greece 
: Igoumenitsa – Preveza
: Preveza – Amfilochia
: Amfilochia 
: Amfilochia – Antirrio (Nafpaktia)
Rio-Antirrio bridge
Olympia Odos: Rio (Patras) – Patras
: Patras – Kalo Nero (Trifylia)
Kalo Nero – Oichalia
: Oichalia (Start of Concurrency with ) – Kalamata, (End of Concurrency with )

References

External links 

 UN Economic Commission for Europe: Overall Map of E-road Network (2007)

55
E047
E047
E055
E055
E055
E055
E055
E055
E055
E055
E055
E055